State Road 48 (NM 48) is a  state highway that runs north–south through the Sacramento Mountains, which are part of the Lincoln National Forest in Lincoln County, New Mexico in the United States. NM 48's southern terminus is at U.S. Route 70 (US 70) in Hollywood, and the northern terminus is at US 380 in Capitan. NM 37 intersects this highway in Angus.

Route description 

NM 48 begins at an intersection with US 70 in Hollywood and begins traveling northward. It then reaches an intersection with NM 37 in Angus. It ends at its northern terminus at US 380 in Capitan.

Major intersections

See also

References

External links

048
Transportation in Lincoln County, New Mexico